The Voyage (also released as The Journey) is a 1974 romantic drama film directed by Vittorio De Sica, based on the short story Il viaggio by Luigi Pirandello. It was De Sica's final film.

Plot
Set in Sicily in the years leading up to World War I, Adriana De Mauro loves Cesar Braggi, but Cesar, honoring his father's dying wish, allows his brother Antonio to marry her. As fate wills, Antonio dies in an automobile accident. Adriana's mourning for Antonio ends when Cesar steps in to rekindle her lust of life. Soon, Adriana begins having dizzy spells. Cesar helps her to a specialist, and the diagnosis is not good. She has an incurable disease. For the rest of their time together, Cesar woos Adriana and eventually proposes to her on a gondola. Yet Signora De Mauro, Adriana's mother, is not pleased with the relationship and argues bitterly with Cesar and stands in the way.

Cast
 Sophia Loren as Adriana de Mauro
 Richard Burton as Cesare Braggi
 Ian Bannen as Antonio Braggi
 Barbara Pilavin as Adriana's Mother
 Renato Pinciroli as Dr. Mascione
 Daniele Vargas as Don Liborio, Lawyer
 Sergio Bruni as Armando Gill
 Ettore Geri as Rinaldo
 Olga Romanelli as Clementina
 Isabelle Marchall as Florist
 Riccardo Mangano as Dr. Carlini
 Annabella Incontrera as Simona

References

External links
 
 
 Il Viaggio (1974) Film: A Late de Sica: From Pirandello Novel By VINCENT CANBY, New York Times, Dec. 1, 1978

1974 films
1974 romantic drama films
1970s French films
1970s historical drama films
1970s historical romance films
1970s Italian films
1970s Italian-language films
Films based on short fiction
Films based on works by Luigi Pirandello
Films directed by Vittorio De Sica
Films produced by Carlo Ponti
Films scored by Manuel De Sica
Films set in the 1910s
Films set in Sicily
French historical drama films
French historical romance films
French romantic drama films
Italian historical drama films
Italian historical romance films
Italian romantic drama films